Rentner haben niemals Zeit ("Retirees never have time") is an East German television series.

See also
List of German television series

External links
 

1978 German television series debuts
1979 German television series endings
German-language television shows
Television in East Germany